The Tasmagambetov Cabinet was the 5th government of Kazakhstan. Led by Prime Minister Imangali Tasmagambetov, it was formed on 28 January 2002 after his predecessor Kassym-Jomart Tokayev stepped down from his post along with his entire cabinet. President Nursultan Nazarbayev nominated Tasmagmabetov for office to which it was unanimously approved by the Parliament. Prior to that, Tasmagambetov served as the Deputy PM under Tokayev's cabinet. It was believed that the cause of the change in the government was an attempt to strengthen its stability as it faced opposition from political groups.

On 11 June 2003, Tasmagambetov resigned after failing to persuade the Parliament to pass a bill in a form desired by President Nazarbayev that would've privatized land in Kazakhstan. He accused of the Parliament for falsifying the vote which took place on 19 May. Nazarbayev appointed Daniyal Akhmetov as the Acting PM who was confirmed by the Parliament on 13 June to form the 6th government. Tasmagambetov that day was appointed as the State Secretary.

Composition

References 

Cabinets of Kazakhstan
2002 in Kazakhstan
Cabinets established in 2002
2002 establishments in Kazakhstan